EMMA is a German feminist magazine. Its print edition is published every two months in Cologne, Germany.

History and profile
The first issue of EMMA was published on 26 January 1977. The founder of the magazine was Alice Schwarzer, who is still publisher and editor-in-chief. The magazine was modelled on the American magazine Ms. in terms of content, targeted audience and layout. It has its headquarters in Cologne. In December 2002, the EMMA website was launched.

The name of the magazine is a wordplay of the term emancipation.

Since its foundation, EMMA has been the leading feminist magazine in Germany, and the only political magazine in Europe entirely run by women.

The magazine has often been criticised for its opinionated and activist stance. However, it has affected German society, creating awareness for and instigating debates on social and women's issues.

Until 2010 the magazine was published every two months. It began to come out quarterly in 2010, but in 2013 it again began to be published every two months.

The estimated circulation of the magazine was 60,000 copies in 2012.

Open letter on German position on Russian invasion of Ukraine 

Alice Schwarzer published an open letter to Chancellor Olaf Scholz in her magazine Emma at the end of April 2022. In it, she and 27 others from the culture and media industry warned of a further escalation of the Ukraine war. They called on Chancellor Scholz not to supply offensive weapons to Ukraine and to do everything he could to end the war. A victory for Ukraine is unlikely, and the military situation must be accepted in order to prevent further deaths, the authors wrote. They wrote: "A Russian counter-attack could then trigger the case for assistance under the NATO treaty and thus the immediate danger of a world war." 

Some of the first signers were actor Lars Eidinger, singer-songwriter Reinhard Mey, controversial comedian Dieter Nuhr, satirical cabaret artist Gerhard Polt, former politician Antje Vollmer (A90/Greens), writer Martin Walser, social scientist Harald Welzer, TV-scientist Ranga Yogeshwar, and writer Juli Zeh.

The open letter amplified a public debate about the position of the German government on the war. The letter attracted a lot of opposition. Political scientist Thomas Jaeger said Schwarzer was factually incorrect. It is covered under international law that a defending state can also support itself with weapons. No distinction is made between defensive and offensive weapons. Also, the Russian president's interpretation can turn anything into a reason for war. Putin's actions are arbitrary.

The journalist Antje Hildebrandt accused the letter signers of selfishness. She compared their demands to people in a burning house who are left on their own because the owner could report this as trespassing.

See also 
 List of magazines in Germany

References

Literature
 Alice Schwarzer: Emma. Die ersten 30 Jahre. München 2007: Kollektion Rolf Heyne.

External links
  
 EMMA at grassrootsfeminism.net

1977 establishments in West Germany
Bi-monthly magazines published in Germany
Feminism in Germany
Feminist magazines
German-language magazines
Magazines established in 1977
Mass media in Cologne
Political magazines published in Germany
Quarterly magazines published in Germany
Women's magazines published in Germany